SM UC-21 was a German Type UC II minelaying submarine or U-boat in the German Imperial Navy during World War I. The U-boat was ordered on 29 August 1915 and was launched on 1 April 1916. She was commissioned into the German Imperial Navy on 12 September 1916 as SM UC-21.

In eleven patrols UC-21 was credited with sinking 98 ships, either by torpedo or by mines laid. They included the British hospital ship , which UC-21 torpedoed in the English Channel on 17 April 1917, killing 29 already wounded soldiers and 12 crew.

UC-21 disappeared after departing Zeebrugge for the Bay of Biscay on 13 September 1917.

Design
Like all pre-UC-25 German Type UC II submarines, UC-21 had a displacement of  when at the surface and  while submerged. The submarine was powered by two six-cylinder four-stroke diesel engines each producing  (a total of ), two electric motors producing , and two propeller shafts.

UC-21 was fitted with six  mine tubes, eighteen UC 200 mines, three  torpedo tubes (one on the stern and two on the bow), seven torpedoes, and one  Uk L/30 deck gun. Her complement was twenty-six crew members.

Summary of raiding history

Notes

References

Bibliography

Ships built in Hamburg
German Type UC II submarines
U-boats commissioned in 1916
Maritime incidents in 1917
U-boats sunk in 1917
World War I minelayers of Germany
World War I shipwrecks in the Atlantic Ocean
World War I submarines of Germany
1916 ships
Missing U-boats of World War I